Li Jiahe (Chinese: 李家赫; born 12 August 1989) is a Chinese footballer who plays as a midfielder for Chinese club Dalian Duxing.

Club career
Li Jiahe started his professional footballer career with Shenzhen Ruby in the Chinese Super League.  He made his Super League debut for Shenzhen on 22 August 2010 in a game against Xi'an Chanba, coming on as a substitute for Hussein Alaa Hussein in the 57th minute. In February 2012, Li transferred to China League One side Harbin Yiteng.

On 24 January 2017, Li moved to Super League side Liaoning Whowin. In his first season with the club he would be part of the squad that was relegated.

Career statistics 
Statistics accurate as of match played 31 December 2020.

References

External links
 

1989 births
Living people
Chinese footballers
Footballers from Shenyang
Shenzhen F.C. players
Zhejiang Yiteng F.C. players
Liaoning F.C. players
Sichuan Jiuniu F.C. players
Hong Kong First Division League players
Chinese Super League players
China League One players
Association football midfielders